Indonesia–Madagascar relations spans for over a millennium, since the ancestors of the people of Madagascar sailed across the Indian Ocean from the Nusantara Archipelago back in 8th or 9th century AD. Indonesia has an embassy in Antananarivo, while Madagascar does not have an accreditation to Indonesia. It was announced in December 2017 that Madagascar would be opening an embassy in Jakarta in 2018, however, the embassy was never opened.

Both countries share the same ethnolinguistic link, in which both national languages and ethnic groups are part of the Austronesian language family and Austronesian peoples, respectively.

History
The historical links between the Nusantara Archipelago and Madagascar took place during the Srivijaya era. It is suggested that the empire contributes to the population of Madagascar  to the south-west. Austronesian peoples' migration to Madagascar is estimated to have happened around 830 AD. According to an extensive new mitochondrial DNA study, native Malagasy people today can likely trace their genetic heritage back to 30 different mothers from Indonesia. Malagasy contains loan words from Sanskrit, all with local linguistic modifications via Javanese or Malay, hint that Madagascar may have been colonized by settlers from the Srivijaya empire. At that time the Srivijayan maritime empire was expanding their maritime trade network.

The trace of linguistic links is evidence in similar words shared between Malagasy language and Indonesian. Some similar words such as hand: ˈtananə (Malagasy), tangan (Malay); skin:ˈhoditra (Malagasy), kulit (Malay); white: ˈfotsy (Malagasy), putih (Malay); island: nosy (Malagasy), nusa (Javanese).

The Malagasy people have genetic links to various Maritime Southeast Asian ethnic groups, particularly from southern Borneo. Parts of the Malagasy language are sourced from the Ma'anyan language with loan words from Sanskrit, with all the local linguistic modifications via Javanese or Malay language. As the Ma'anyan and Dayak people are not a sailor and were dry-rice cultivators while some Malagasy are wet rice farmers, it is likely that they are carried by the Javanese and Malay people in their trading fleets, as labor or slaves.

Javanese trading and slaving activities in Africa caused a strong influence on boat-building on Madagascar and the East African coast. This is indicated by the existence of outriggers and oculi (eye ornament) on African boats.

Diplomatic relations were officially established in the 1960s. However, it was not until 2009 that Indonesia opened their embassy in Antananarivo, while the Madagascar embassy in Tokyo is also accredited to Indonesia.

In 2003, a Borobudur ship expedition visited Madagascar, sailed from Indonesia on its way to Accra, Ghana. The ship was reconstructed from Borobudur panel, and the reenactment voyage demonstrated ancient trading links between Indonesia and Africa (in particular East Africa and Madagascar). The treacherous Cinnamon shipping route took vessels from Indonesian waters across the Indian Ocean past the Seychelles, Madagascar, and South Africa to Ghana. It is also to demonstrate of how ancient Indonesians sailors and settlers reached Madagascar.

High level visit
In November 2008, Madagascar President Marc Ravalomanana visited Indonesia and met Indonesian President Susilo Bambang Yudhoyono. This is his second visit to Indonesia, previously in 2005 Ravalomanana visited Indonesia during Asian-African Conference anniversary in Bandung.

Notes

Madagascar
Bilateral relations of Madagascar